This is a List of Old Rugbeians, they being notable former students – known as "Old Rugbeians" of the Church of England school, Rugby School in Rugby, Warwickshire, England.

Academia 
 L.A. Adamson, Headmaster of Wesley College, Melbourne
Donald Beves (1896–1961), English modern linguist
 R. G. Collingwood, English historian and Professor of Metaphysics at the University of Oxford
 Richard Congreve (1818–1899), English philosopher
 Marcus Flather, Clinical Professor in Medicine at the University of East Anglia
 Henry Watson Fowler, English lexicographer, author of Fowler's Modern English Usage
 T. H. Green, moral and political philosopher and reformer
 R. M. Hare, English moral philosopher
 Fenton John Anthony Hort, English theologian
 F. L. Lucas, Reader in English Literature at the University of Cambridge, scholar, critic and writer
 Edward Ellis Morris, Educationist, second Headmaster of Melbourne Grammar School (1875–83), and miscellaneous writer
 Edward Samuel Morris (1940–2016), art historian
 Frederick York Powell, Regius Professor of Modern History (Oxford)
 Henry John Stephen Smith, Irish mathematician
 Jon Stallworthy, Professor of English at the University of Oxford
 Sir Percy Sykes soldier, diplomat, writer and scholar
 Richard Henry Tawney, one of Britain's leading Christian Socialist thinkers and writers, and a prominent British economic and social historian
 Henry Wace, Principal of King's College London (1883–1897), former Dean of Canterbury
 Wynne Godley, economist
 Sir Will Spens, educationalist and Master of Corpus Christi College, Cambridge (1927-1952)
 Sir Hew Francis Anthony Strachan, Chichele Professor of the History of War

The Armed Forces 
 Field Marshal Sir Archibald James Cassels , former Chief of the General Staff & Commander-in-Chief of the British Army of the Rhine
Admiral Granville Proby, 3rd Earl of Carysfort, fought during the French Revolutionary and Napoleonic Wars
 Admiral Sir Geoffrey Oliver  & Two Bars, British officer during the Second World War
Admiral Sir Guy Grantham GCB CBE DSO, Vice Chief of the Naval Staff; Commander-in-Chief, Mediterranean Fleet; Commander-in-Chief, Portsmouth and Governor of Malta
General Arthur Clifton GCB, general who was a regimental commander during the Napoleonic Wars, and took over command of the Union Brigade during the Battle of Waterloo
General Sir Ivor Maxse KCB, CVO, DSO, General Officer Commanding XVIII Corps during World War I; renown for his innovative and effective training methods
General Sir James Marshall-Cornwall KCB, CBE, DSO, MC, General Officer Commanding, British Troops in Egypt during World War II
General Sir George Giffard , Commander-in-Chief, 11th Army Group in World War II
General Sir Thomas Astley Cubitt KCB, CMG, DSO,  commanded 57th Brigade and then 38th (Welsh) Division during World War I and later was appointed Governor of Bermuda 
General Sir Harold Edmund Franklyn KCB, DSO, MC, General Officer Commanding, 5th Infantry Division during the withdrawal to Dunkirk & later Commander-in-Chief, Home Forces
 General John Proby, 2nd Earl of Carysfort, British General during the French Revolutionary and Napoleonic Wars; also a Whig politician
General Sir Richard Wakefield Goodbody GCB, KBE, DSO, Commander-in-Chief, Northern Command and Adjutant General 
General Sir Horatio Shirley KCB, fought in the Crimean War
Vice Admiral Sir Ian Corder KBE CB, UK Military Representative to NATO
Lieutenant General Sir Ralph Abercromby KB, General during the French Revolutionary and Napoleonic Wars who was Commander-in-Chief, Ireland; he was also MP for Clackmannanshire, and Governor of Trinidad
Lieutenant General William Augustus Johnson, fought as a junior officer in the French Revolutionary and Napoleonic Wars
 Lieutenant General Arthur Ernest Percival  & Bar, the General Officer Commanding, Malaya during World War II who surrendered Singapore to the Imperial Japanese Army
 Lieutenant General Sir Henry Royds Pownall KCB, KBE, DSO & Bar, former Vice Chief of the Imperial General Staff & Chief of Staff for the British Expeditionary Force during the Battle of France
Lieutenant General Henry Andrew Sarel CB fought in the Indian Mutiny and Second Opium War; later Lieutenant Governor of Guernsey 
Lieutenant General Jonathan Peel, general and politician
Lieutenant General Henry Hope Crealock CB CMG, commanded a division in the Anglo-Zulu War
 Lieutenant General Sir Lewis Pelly KCSI, East India Company army officer and Conservative MP
Lieutenant General Sir Charles Arbuthnot GCB, Commander-in-Chief, Bombay Army and Commander-in-Chief, Madras Army
Lieutenant General Sir Robin Carnegie KCB, OBE, a former Military Secretary
 Lieutenant General Timothy Radford CB DSO OBE, current Commander, Allied Rapid Reaction Corps
 Lieutenant General Willoughby Cotton Commander-in-Chief, Bombay Army
Major-General Sir George Forestier-Walker KCB, commanded 21st Division and 27th Division on the Western Front and as part of the British Salonika Army during World War I
Major-General William Donovan Stamer CB, CBE, DSO, MC, commanded 161st Infantry Brigade, Sudan Defence Force and 131st Infantry Brigade during World War II
Major-General Sir Charles Sim Bremridge Parsons KCMG CB, Commander of the British Troops in Canada 
 Major-General Sir Harcourt Mortimer Bengough KCB, fought in the Crimean War, Anglo-Zulu War and Third Anglo-Burmese War
Major-General Sir William Eyre KCB, commanded 3rd Brigade and later 3rd Division in the Crimean War; later Commander-in-Chief, North America
Major-General Sir Ernest Dunlop Swinton KBE CB DSO, instrumental in the development of the tank
 Major-General Philip de Fonblanque DSO, commanded the Lines of Communication for the British Expeditionary Force during the Battle of France
 Major-General Geoffrey Bruce , Deputy Chief of Staff of the British Indian Army; also a member of the 1922 British Mount Everest expedition and 1924 British Mount Everest expedition
Major-General Horatio Pettus Mackintosh Berney-Ficklin CB, MC, Divisional Commander in Persia, Iraq, Madagascar and Italy during World War II
Major General John Fielden Brocklehurst, 1st Baron Ranksborough CB CVO
Major-General Sir William Godwin Michelmore KBE, CB, DSO, MC, TD, commanded Devon and Cornwall County Division, 77th Infantry Division and 45th Holding Division during World War II; later Lord Mayor of Exeter
Major-General Victor Campbell CB DSO OBE
Air Vice Marshal Augustus Henry Orlebar CBE AFC & Bar, British Army and Royal Air Force officer who served in both world wars
Brigadier-General Sir Percy Molesworth Sykes KCIE CB CMG, soldier, diplomat, and scholar with a considerable literary output
Brigadier-General John Tyson Wigan CB, CMG, DSO, commanded 12th Cavalry Brigade. After the war he was the MP for Abingdon, 1918–1921
Brigadier-General George MacLeay Macarthur-Onslow CMG, DSO, commanded 5th Light Horse Brigade of the Australian Army during World War I
Brigadier-General Sir Alexander Gibb GBE CB FRS, Chief Engineer Ports Construction to the British Army in France and Civil Engineer-in-Chief to the Admiralty
Brigadier-General Anthony Courage , Regimental Colonel of the 15th/19th The King's Royal Hussars.
Brigadier Philip Bowden-Smith CBE, Commander of 125th Infantry Brigade which later became 10th Armoured Brigade; he also represented Great Britain at the 1924 Olympic Games
 Brigadier Raymond Ladais Sandover DSO ED, Commander 2/11th Battalion (Australia) and 6th Australian Infantry Brigade
 Colonel Sir Henry Wilmot, 5th Baronet VC, KCB, awarded the Victoria Cross during the Indian Mutiny
 Colonel Osmond Barnes, Chief Herald of the Indian Empire
Colonel Lionel Beaumont-Thomas MC MP, British Army officer during both World Wars and Conservative Member of Parliament for Birmingham King's Norton
Colonel James Duff Army Officer who fought in the Crimean War and later became a Conservative MP
Colonel Evan Henry Llewellyn, commander of the 2nd (Central African) Battalion, King's African Rifles
Colonel Robin Evelegh, British Army officer who authored 'Peace-Keeping in a Democratic Society'
 William Proby, Lord Proby, a British Royal Navy officer and Whig politician
Lieutenant Colonel Christopher Bushell VC DSO, won the Victoria Cross and Distinguished Service Order during World War I
Lieutenant-Colonel Gerald Rufus Isaacs, 2nd Marquess of Reading GCMG CBE MC TD PC QC, Liberal then Conservative politician and barrister who fought in World War I
Lieutenant-Colonel Kanwar Shumshere Singh, doctor in the Indian Medical Service 
Lieutenant-Colonel Alexander "Alec" Ogilvie CBE, early aviation pioneer
 Lieutenant Colonel Henry Bruce, 2nd Baron Aberdare, British officer during the First World War
Lieutenant Commander Robert Selby Armitage GC GM, won both the George Cross and George Medal for his bomb disposal work during the Second World War
Lieutenant Commander John Bryan Peter Duppa-Miller GC, Royal Navy officer who was awarded the George Cross for bomb disposal work during the Blitz
Major Arthur Willan Keen MC, British World War I flying ace credited with fourteen aerial victories
 William Hodson, commander during the 1857 Indian mutiny and founder of Hodson's Horse
 Major Bruce Shand, MC and Bar, officer in the British Army and father of Camilla, HRH The Duchess of Cornwall
Squadron Leader William Spurrett Fielding-Johnson MC and Bar, DFC, army officer in World War I before joining the RFC and RAF in both World Wars
Squadron Leader Hedley Fowler MC, RAF officer who escaped from Colditz
Captain John Norwood VC won the Victoria Cross during World War I
Captain Charles Roger Lupton DSC*, British World War I flying ace credited with five aerial victories
Captain Kenneth Barbour Montgomery MC, British World War I flying ace credited with twelve aerial victories
Lieutenant Frank Alexander de Pass VC, the first Jew and the first officer of the Indian Army to receive the Victoria Cross during World War I
Lieutenant Alfred Gordon Clark VC, won the Victoria Cross during World War I
 Lieutenant Arthur Conolly, British Officer in 6th Bengal Native Light Cavalry. Coined the phrase 'The Great Game'
Lieutenant Donald Hankey, wrote two volumes of essays about the British volunteer army in World War I both titled 'A Student in Arms'
 Sir James Arnold Stacey Cleminson, KBE, MC
 Edmund Musgrave Barttelot, British Army officer who was part of Henry Stanley's Emin Pasha Relief Expedition of 1886-89
Henry Ward, 5th Viscount Bangor British Army Officer who fought in the Xhosa Wars

Aviation 
 Christopher Orlebar, British Concorde pilot, aviation lecturer and writer
 John Gillespie Magee, Junior, Anglo-American poet and aviator

Building, Engineering and Architecture 
 Sir Charles Brett, architectural historian
 Will Butler-Adams, managing director of Brompton Bicycle Limited
 William Grierson, civil engineer
 Sir Charles Nicholson, ecclesiastical designer and architect  
 David Ogle, industrial designer and car designer
 Thomas Henry Poole, architect of numerous churches and schools in New York City
 Reid Railton, automotive engineer and designer of land and water speed record vehicles
 Sir Harry Ricardo, designer of the internal combustion engine and patentee of the two-stroke engine
 Clement E. Stretton, consulting engineer and author.

Business 
 Richard Jewson, businessman and Lord Lieutenant of Norfolk
 Charles Tertius Mander, first baronet, manufacturer, public servant and philanthropist.
 Clive Schlee, businessman, CEO of Pret a Manger
 Nusli Wadia, businessman, Chairman of the Wadia Group, son of Neville Wadia and Dina Wadia, grandson of Muhammad Ali Jinnah and Rattanbai Jinnah

Civil Service 
Sir Christopher Bullock KCB CBE, Permanent Under-Secretary at the Air Ministry
Sir Bertram Blakiston Cubitt KCB, civil servant in the War Office
 Sir George Coldstream KCB KCVO QC, Permanent Secretary to the Lord Chancellor's Office
 Sir Arthur Franks KCMG, Chief of the Secret Intelligence Service
 Sir Ernest Gowers GCB GBE, civil servant and author of The Complete Plain Words
Sir Godfrey Lushington, GCMG, KCB, Permanent Under-Secretary of the Home Office 1886–1895; championed prison reform
 Sir Nicholas Montagu KCB, Chairman of H.M. Inland Revenue, 1997–2004
Maurice Hankey, 1st Baron Hankey, GCB, GCMG, GCVO, PC, Secretary to the Committee of Imperial Defence; and 1st Cabinet Secretary
J. M. Bruce Lockhart CB CMG, intelligence officer

Colonial Service and Imperial Administration 
 Sir Alexander John Arbuthnot KCSI, colonial administrator and writer
 Crawford Murray MacLehose, Baron MacLehose of Beoch, the 25th Governor of Hong Kong
Sir Jervoise Athelstane Baines CSI, member of the Indian Civil Service
Sir Henry Conway Belfield KCMG JP, Resident of Negeri Sembilan; Resident of Selangor; British Resident of Perak and  finally Governor of the British East Africa Protectorate
Maurice Collis colonial administrator in Burma; later a writer on South-East Asia
Arthur Conolly (1807–1842), captain in the East India Company's service
Henry Valentine Conolly, member of the Indian Civil Service
The Honourable Sir Ashley Eden KCSI CIE, Chief Commissioner of British Crown Colony of Burma and Lieutenant-Governor of Bengal
Sir Thomas Douglas Forsyth KCSI CB, Administrator of the British Raj
Patrick William Forbes, Commander of the British South Africa Police, who invaded Matabeland in the First Matabele War; later Magistrate of Mashonaland 1893–1894; Administrator of North-Western Rhodesia 1895–1897
Sir Robert Allason Furness KBE CMG, classicist and representative of the British Council in Egypt, 1945-1950
Sir Henry Paul Harvey KCMG, Egyptian Financial Advisor from 1907 to 1912 and 1919–1920
Sir Frederick James Halliday KCB, first Lieutenant-Governor of Bengal
Stephen Rumbold Lushington,  Governor of Madras 1827–1832 and Tory politician
Leonard Fielding Nalder colonial administrator who served as Governor of Fung Province 1927–1930 and Mongalla province 1930–1936 in Anglo-Egyptian Sudan
James Alexander Richey CIE, educational administrator in South Africa and India
Sir Richard Temple, 1st Baronet, GCSI, CIE, PC, FRS, Lieutenant-Governor of Bengal 1874–1877; Governor of Bombay 1877–1880 and also an MP
Sir Theodore Cracraft Hope KCSI CIE, civil servant of the Government of India, including Public Works
Sir George Chardin Denton, Governor of Gambia
John Loader Maffey, 1st Baron Rugby GCMG KCB KCVO CSI CIE, Chief Commissioner of the North-West Frontier Province; Governor-General of the Sudan; and Permanent Under-Secretary of State for the Colonies
 John Arthur Godley, 1st Baron Kilbracken GCB, Permanent Under-Secretary of State for India 1883–1909
 Sir William Frederick Gowers KCMG, Governor of Uganda
 John Claude White CIE, Deputy Commissioner of the Tibet Frontier Commission

Diplomatic Service 
 Sir Charles Bagot GCB, MP, diplomat and administrator
Sir Thomas Bromley KCMG, Ambassador to Somalia, Syria, Algeria & Ethiopia
Sir Julian Bullard GCMG, Ambassador to West Germany
Arthur Nicolson, 1st Baron Carnock GCB GCMG GCVO KCIE, Ambassador to Spain; to Russia and finally Permanent Under Secretary for Foreign Affairs
Richard Émile Augustin de Candolle, Consul to the Canton of Geneva
 Baron Charles de Chassiron, Vice Marshal of the Diplomatic Corps, 2001–2006
 Sir Leycester Coltman, Ambassador to Cuba from 1991 to 1994 and to Colombia 1994–1998; author of The Real Fidel Castro
Sir John Coulson KCMG, Ambassador to Sweden and Secretary-General of the European Free Trade Association
Sir Moore Crosthwaite KCMG, Ambassador to Lebanon and to Sweden
Sir Patrick Henry Dean GCMG, Permanent Representative to the UN 1960–1964; Ambassador to the United States 1965–1969 and also Chairman of the Joint Intelligence Committee
Sir Henry Drummond Wolff GCB GCMG PC, High Commissioner to Egypt; Envoy Extraordinary and Minister Plenipotentiary to Teheran; and Ambassador to Spain; also a Conservative Politician
Sir Ewen Fergusson GCMG GCVO, Principal Private Secretary to the Foreign Secretary 1975–1978; Ambassador to South Africa 1982–1984 and to France 1987–1992
Sir Anthony Figgis, KCVO CMG, Ambassador to Austria 1996–2000; Marshal of the Diplomatic Corps 2001–2008 and the current Gentleman Usher of the Blue Rod
Sir Edward Goschen, 1st Baronet GCB GCMG GCVO PC, Ambassador to Serbia, to Denmark, to Austria-Hungary and to Germany; later Gentleman Usher to the Sword of State
Robert Hankey, 2nd Baron Hankey KCMG KCVO, Ambassador to Sweden 1954–1960
Sir James Hudson GCB, Ambassador to Turin
Augustus Henry Mounsey, Minister Resident and Consul General to Colombia
Sir Owen O'Malley KCMG Minister to Hungary 1939–1941;  British ambassador to the Polish government in exile during World War II; and Ambassador to Portugal 1945–1957
Sir Maurice Peterson GCMG, Minister to Bulgaria 1936–1938; Ambassador to Iraq 1938–1939; to Spain 1939–1940; to Turkey 1944–1946 and to Russia 1946–1949
Sir Frank Roberts GCMG GCVO, Ambassador to Yugoslavia, 1954–1957; Permanent Representative on the North Atlantic Council 1957–1960; Ambassador to the USSR 1960–1962; to West Germany 1963–1968
Ian Samuel CMG CVO, diplomat and RAF officer during World War II
Sir William Seeds KCMG, Ambassador to Brazil 1930–1935; and Ambassador to Russia 1939–1940
Sir Alan Urwick, KCVO, CMG, Ambassador to Jordan 1979–1984; to Egypt 1985–1987; British High Commissioner to Canada 1987–1989 and Serjeant-at-Arms of the House of Commons 1989–1995
Sir Charles Richard Vaughan, GCH, PC, Minister to Switzerland 1823–1825 and Minister to the United States 1825–1835
Sir Peter Wilkinson, Ambassador to Vietnam in 1966–1967; also a SOE agent during World War II
Sir Michael S. Williams, KCMG, Ambassador to Guatemala 1962–1963; and Envoy Extraordinary and Minister Plenipotentiary to the Holy See 1965–1970

Ecclesiastics 
 Robert Barbour, lecturer in theology, moderator of the church of Scotland, and holder of the Military Cross
George Bradley, Dean of Westminster
Charles Boyd, Archdeacon of Colombo
Godwin Birchenough, Dean of Ripon Cathedral
John Bickersteth KCVO, Bishop of Bath and Wells and Clerk of the Closet
Geoffrey Clayton, Archdeacon of Chesterfield; Bishop of Johannesburg and Archbishop of Cape Town
Thomas Legh Claughton, Bishop of Rochester and Bishop of St Albans.
George Chase MC, Master of Selwyn College, Cambridge and Bishop of Ripon
Reverend William Lucas Collins
James Cotton, Dean of Bangor
Francis Cramer-Roberts, Bishop of Nassau and Archdeacon of Blackburn
Reverend Sir Frederick Larkins Currie, 2nd Baronet
Edwin Dodgson
Alan Campbell Don KCVO, Chaplain to the Speaker of the House of Commons 1936–1946 and Dean of Westminster 1946–1959
Nowell Twopeny, Archdeacon of Flinders
Edward Feild, Bishop of Newfoundland and Archdeacon of Bermuda
Launcelot Fleming, Bishop of Portsmouth and Bishop of Norwich
 Rev. Thomas Valpy French, first Bishop of Lahore
Archibald Ronald Gordon, Bishop of Portsmouth, Bishop at Lambeth and Bishop to the Forces
Rupert Hoare, Dean of Liverpool and Bishop of Dudley
Percy Mark Herbert KCVO, the first Bishop of Blackburn; Bishop of Norwich and Clerk of the Closet
Hugh Hornby, Bishop of Hulme
Phipps Hornby, Archdeacon of Lancaster
 Rev Francis Jayne, Bishop of Chester and academic
Thomas Jex-Blake, Dean of Wells also a teacher and Headmaster of Rugby
Michael Gresford Jones, Bishop of Willesden and Bishop of St Albans
Edwin Kempson, Bishop of Warrington
Francis Kilner, Bishop of Richmond
Carey Knyvett, Archdeacon of Northampton and Bishop of Selby
William Lake, Dean of Durham
John Lawton, Archdeacon of Warrington
Edward Legge, Dean of Windsor and Bishop of Oxford
William MacKennal, Archdeacon of Ely
 Hugh Montefiore, Bishop of Kingston 1970–1978 and Bishop of Birmingham 1977–1987
Frank Okell, Bishop of Stockport and Archdeacon of Macclesfield
Grandage Powell, Archdeacon of Carlisle and Bishop of Penrith
John Purchas, Church of England priest who was prosecuted for ritualist practices
Norman Rathbone, Dean of Hereford
Charles Waldegrave Sandford, Bishop of Gibraltar
Augustus Shears, clergyman who translated part of the Prayer Book into Burmese
Walter Waddington Shirley, churchman and ecclesiastical historian
Richard Fitzgeorge de Stacpoole, 1st Duc de Stacpoole
Lovelace Stamer, Archdeacon of Stoke and Bishop of Shrewsbury
Arthur Penrhyn Stanley, English churchman, and Dean of Westminster
Arthur Stanton Anglo-catholic priest
John Stott, evangelical minister who later was a curate of All Souls, Langham place and a leading figure involved in drafting the Lausanne Covenant
Alfred Swann, Dean and Archdeacon of Hong Kong
Henry Herbert Symonds, Anglican priest who was a driving force behind the creation of National Parks
Frederick Stephen Temple, Dean of Hong Kong and Bishop of Malmesbury
 William Temple,  Bishop of Manchester 1921–29; Archbishop of York 1929–42 and Archbishop of Canterbury 1942–44; an influential radical thinker, and father of the post-war Welfare State
David Urquhart, Bishop of Birkenhead and the current bishop of Birmingham
Henry Wace, Dean of Canterbury
Richard Watson, Bishop of Burnley
Edward Were, Bishop of Derby 1889–1909, and Bishop of Stafford 1909–1915
Edward Winnington-Ingram, Archdeacon of Hereford

The Law 
 Hubert Parker, Baron Parker of Waddington, Lord Chief Justice of England and Wales
 Mark Colville, 4th Viscount Colville of Culross, judge and politician. He was one of the 92 hereditary peers elected to remain in the House of Lords after the House of Lords Act 1999.
 Charles Bowen, 1st Baron Bowen QC, PC, Lord of Appeal in Ordinary
 Horace Davey, Baron Davey PC, Lord of Appeal in Ordinary
 David Hope, Baron Hope of Craighead KT PC, Lord of Appeal in Ordinary
 Sir Edward Marshall-Hall KC, English barrister and orator
 Sir Michael Kerry KCB, QC, former HM Procurator General and Treasury Solicitor
 Robert Barton, Irish lawyer and statesman who worked on the Anglo-Irish Treaty
 Major Sir Thomas Hetherington KCB, CBE, QC, TD, barrister and first head of the Crown Prosecution Service
Edmund Yorke, Legal scholar and barrister
 Sir Robert Akenhead, High Court Judge and Head of the Technology and Construction Court
Wilfred Baugh Allen, judge
Sir Lewis Cave, judge
Sir George Farwell, Lord Justice of Appeal
Sir James Edmund Sandford Fawcett, DSC QC, barrister and member of the European Commission for Human Rights
Alfred Gordon Clark, judge
Charles Sprengel Greaves
Philip Guedalla, barrister
Sir Alfred van Waterschoodt Lucie-Smith, colonial judge who became Chief Justice of Trinidad and Tobago
 Roundell Palmer, 1st Earl of Selborne, Lord Chancellor 1872–1874 & 1880–1885; Attorney General for England and Wales 1863–1866; and Solicitor General for England and Wales 1861–1863
Sir Lawrence Peel PC,  Advocate-General of Bengal and Chief Justice of Bengal
Cuthbert Snowball Rewcastle, county court judge and liberal party politician
Thomas Bateman Napier county court judge and politician
John Sandford, judicial commissioner of Burma and Mysore
Sir Leslie Frederic Scott, KC, Lord Justice of Appeal and Liberal MP
William Patrick Spens, 1st Baron Spens KBE, PC, KC, Chief Justice of India
Roger John Laugharne Thomas, Baron Thomas of Cwmgiedd Kt PC, President of the Queen's Bench Division and the current Lord Chief Justice of England and Wales
Jonathan David Chattyn Turner, barrister specialising in intellectual property and competition law
Dudley Ward, New Zealand judge and politician

Literature
 Matthew Arnold, Victorian poet and critic (son of Headmaster Dr Thomas Arnold)
 Rupert Brooke, English poet
 Arthur Hugh Clough, English poet
 Charles Lutwidge Dodgson, better known as Lewis Carroll, famous for Alice's Adventures in Wonderland
 Richard Doyle, English author
 Dominic Hibberd, English critic and biographer
 Anthony Horowitz, English writer
 Edmund George Valpy Knox, editor of Punch
 Walter Savage Landor, English writer and poet
 Wyndham Lewis, British painter and author
 John Gillespie Magee, Junior, Anglo-American poet and aviator
 Arthur Ransome, British children's author
 Mario Reading, author
 Sir Salman Rushdie, author and essayist, Booker Prize winner for Midnight's Children. Said of his time: "Almost the only thing I am proud of about going to Rugby school was that Lewis Carroll went there too."<ref>[https://www.theguardian.com/theobserver/2011/jun/26/salman-rushdie-luka-fatwa-tim-adams Salman Rushdie: 'The Arab spring is a demand for desires and rights that are common to all human beings'''], Telegraph</ref>
 J.K. Stanford, English author
 Francis Stuart, IRA member, Nazi collaborator and Irish novelist.
 Thomas Hughes, English lawyer and author of Tom Brown's SchooldaysMajor Geoffrey Cecil Gilbert McNeill-Moss British army officer and novelist

 Media, Entertainment and the Arts 
 Charles Acton, music critic at The Irish Times Faris Badwan, aka Faris Rotter, vocalist from band The Horrors
 Roy Beddington, painter, illustrator, author, and journalist
 William Bullock, journalist at The Daily News David Carritt (1927–1982), British art historian, dealer and critic
 Charlie Charters, Author, rugby union official, sports executive and journalist
 Tom Cowan/Furse, Bassist from band The Horrors
 Freddie Cowan, Guitarist from band The Vaccines
 Frank Barrington Craig, British portrait painter
 David Croft, (born David Sharland) Television writer, producer and director
 David Haig, English actor and writer
 Arthur fforde, BBC chairman
 Isabel Fay, comedy actress and writer
 Dan Haigh, bassist, Fightstar, Gunship (band)
 Robert Hardy, English stage and film actor
 John Hawkesworth, television producer, Upstairs, Downstairs Sir Charles Hawtrey, Victorian era stage actor
 Marmaduke Hussey, BBC chairman
 Hugh Johnson, British wine writer
 Pete Kember, musician, Spacemen 3
 John Kentish, English operatic tenor
 Wyndham Lewis, British painter and author
 Richard Hey Lloyd, British organist and composer
 William Charles Macready, English stage actor
 Robin Milford, British musician
 Sydney Nicholson, British musician
 Sir Anthony Quayle, British actor
 Andrew Rawnsley, British political journalist
 Andy Richards, British / Australian musician, composer and organist
 Adnan Sami, singer, pianist, actor and composer
 Richard Talbot Kelly, MBE, MC, RI, soldier and artist
 Alex Westaway, guitarist and singer, Fightstar, Gunship (band)
 A. N. Wilson, English writer and newspaper columnist
 Sophie Xeon, Singer and musician

 Medicine and Science 
 William Bateson, English geneticist
 Miles Joseph Berkeley, English botanist
 Humphry Bowen, British botanist and chemist
 Dr Peter Brinsden, fertility expert
 Abel Chapman, big game hunter and naturalist who started South Africa's first game reserve
 Alex Hankey, English theoretical physicist
 Walter W. Holland, public health physician
 Andrew Karney, Senior Scientist, The General Electric Company
 Sir Geoffrey Langdon Keynes, physician and scholar, brother of economist John Maynard Keynes
 Sir Philip Henry Manson-Bahr, zoologist and MD, MRCP, FRCP
 David Marr, British psychologist
Donald Michie, British researcher in artificial intelligence who during World War II, worked for the Government Code and Cypher School at Bletchley Park, to break "Tunny", a German teleprinter cipher
 George Mitchell Seabroke, British astronomer
 Frederick Courteney Selous, British explorer, officer, hunter, and conservationist, known for his exploits in South-East Africa
 Sir George Augustus William Shuckburgh-Evelyn, 6th Baronet, won the Copley Medal
 Nevil Sidgwick, English theoretical chemist
 E. Barton Worthington (1905-2001), ecologist and science administrator
 Babulal Sethia, President of the Royal Society of Medicine and cardiac surgeon

 Politics 
 Richard Baker Wingfield-Baker, Liberal Party MP
Leonard Behrens Liberal Party Politician
William Noel-Hill, 3rd Baron Berwick, PC, Tory politician and British Minister to Sardinia 
Sir Thomas Birch, 2nd Baronet Whig politician
 Sir Noël Vansittart Bowater, 2nd Baronet GBE MC, Lord Mayor of London
Sir Orlando Bridgeman, 2nd Baronet Whig politician
Arthur Montagu Brookfield Conservative Politician, diplomat and army officer
Sir William Cunliffe Brooks, 1st Baronet, Conservative Politician
Esmond Bulmer, Conservative MP
Marston Clarke Buszard QC Liberal Party MP and barrister
William John Dalzell Burnyeat, Liberal Party politician
Charles Howard, 10th Earl of Carlisle Liberal Unionist politician and army officer
 Sir Thomas Cave, 5th Baronet, politician and lawyer
Harold Cawley Liberal Party MP, killed in World War I 
Oswald Cawley Liberal Party MP, killed in World War I 
 Austen Chamberlain, British statesman and recipient of the Nobel Peace Prize
 Neville Chamberlain, politician and former Prime Minister
Sir Sydney Chapman, Conservative Member of Parliament (MP) for Birmingham Handsworth and  Chipping Barnet
James Thomas, 1st Viscount Cilcennin PC, Conservative MP and First Lord of the Admiralty 
Samuel Clowes, Conservative politician
Herbert James Craig CBE Liberal politician
Sir George Crewe, 8th Baronet Tory politician
William John Evelyn, Conservative politician
Sir Frederick William Fison, 1st Baronet, Conservative politician
Charles Berkeley, 3rd Baron FitzHardinge, Liberal politician
 Tetley Gant, Tasmanian politician and Chancellor University of Tasmania
Euan Geddes, 3rd Baron Geddes, Current Deputy Speaker in the House of Lords
Sir Richard Gilpin, 1st Baronet, Conservative Politician and Lieutenant Colonel in the British Army
 George Goschen, 1st Viscount Goschen, Liberal Unionist politician; served as Chancellor of the Exchequer 1887–1892, First Lord of the Admiralty 1871–1874 and 1895–1900
Captain Alan Graham Conservative politician
 Frank Gray, inter-war Liberal politician
The Honourable Ronald Greville, Conservative MP
Lieutenant-Colonel Sir Arthur Sackville Trevor Griffith-Boscawen PC Conservative politician
Sir Jeremy James Hanley, KCMG, Conservative MP; Chairman of the Conservative Party 1994–1995 and Minister without portfolio 1994–1995
 Sir Reginald Hanson, Conservative politician and Lord Mayor of London
Henry Peirson Harland Unionist politician
William Harrison-Broadley Conservative MP
Edward John Littleton, 1st Baron Hatherton PC, Canningite Tory and later Whig politician, Chief Secretary for Ireland, also a major Staffordshire landowner, farmer and businessman
Sir Arthur Adlington Haworth, 1st Baronet, Liberal politician
Sir Hubert Douglas Henderson Liberal political advisor and economist 
 Charles Hendry, British politician and the Conservative Member of Parliament for Wealden
William Holbech Member of Parliament for Banbury
Edward Horsman PC PC(Ire), MP and Chief Secretary for Ireland
 Alan Howarth, Baron Howarth of Newport, Labour Party politician 
 Frederick Curzon, 7th Earl Howe, Conservative health spokesman in the House of Lords
 Thomas Gair Ashton, 1st Baron Ashton of Hyde, Edwardian Liberal Party politician and industrialist
Colonel Herbert Merton Jessel, 1st Baron Jessel CB, CMG, TD, DL, JP, Liberal Unionist and later Conservative politician; the third Mayor of Westminster
Lieutenant Colonel Sir Edgar Mayne Keatinge CBE Soldier who was a Conservative politician
Wilfred Byng Kenrick, Lord Mayor of Birmingham and industrialist
 Tom King, Baron King of Bridgwater, Conservative Party politician
William Kingan, Unionist politician
 Henry King-Tenison, 8th Earl of Kingston, Irish peer and Victorian Conservative Party politician
Isaac Cowley Lambert Conservative MP and solicitor
 Ian Lang, Baron Lang of Monkton, Conservative Party politician
Francis Charles Lawley Liberal party politician and journalist
 Henry Lefroy, Western Australian politician
Colonel Evan Henry Llewellyn Conservative politician 
William Lyttelton, 3rd Baron Lyttelton Whig politician
Miles MacInnes Liberal MP and railway director
 Sir Charles Tertius Mander, 1st Baronet, four times  Mayor of Wolverhampton and an industrialist 
Sir Arthur Markham, 1st Baronet Liberal MP and industrialist 
 Angus Maude, Baron Maude of Stratford-upon-Avon, Conservative Party politician and father of Conservative Cabinet member Francis Maude
George Melly Liberal MP and shipowner
Arthur Mills Conservative MP
Charles Mills MP and Director of the East India Company
 Andrew Mitchell, British Conservative politician and Secretary of State for International Development (from May 2010)
Edmund Morris MP
George Herbert Morrell Conservative MP and lawyer
Thomas Bateman Napier Liberal MP and judge
Sir John Holbrook Osborn Conservative MP
Francis Otter Liberal MP
 Sukhumbhand Paribatra, Thai politician, 15th Governor of Bangkok
Sir William Pearce, 2nd Baronet Conservative politician and industrialist 
Jonathan Peel Conservative MP;  Surveyor-General of the Ordnance 1841–1846 and Secretary of State for War 1858–1859 & 1866–1867
Albert Pell Conservative MP and solicitor 
Sir Edward Penton, Mayor of St Marylebone; Superintendent of the Royal Army Clothing Department (Boot Section) 1914–1919 and Chief Inspector of Clothing for the Central Ordnance Depot
Edwin Berkeley Portman Liberal MP and barrister
Thomas Bayley Potter Liberal MP
Walter Powell, Conservative MP and colliery owner
David Pugh, Liberal MP
Cuthbert Snowball Rewcastle Liberal politician
John Bonfoy Rooper MP
 Shane Ross, Irish politicians and journalist 
Henry Bucknall Betterton, 1st Baron Rushcliffe, GBE, PC, conservative politician and barrister who was Minister of Labour 1931–1934
Harold Rushworth New Zealand politician from the County Party
Sir Henry Bernhard Samuelson, 2nd Baronet Liberal MP
Sir Leslie Frederic Scott, KC, Lord Justice of Appeal and Liberal MP
Alexander Craig Sellar MP
Evelyn Shirley MP
Walter Shirley Shirley Liberal MP and barrister
Sir George Augustus William Shuckburgh-Evelyn, 6th Baronet MP,  mathematician and astronomer 
 Ernest Simon, 1st Baron Simon of Wythenshawe, politician and industrialist
Sir Thomas Skipwith, 4th Baronet MP
Samuel George Smith Conservative MP and banker
Edward Smith Tory MP
Tim Smith, Liberal Party of Australia member of the Victorian Legislative Assembly 
Richard Spooner MP
Harry Grey, 4th Earl of Stamford MP and peer
 Edward Henry Stanley, 15th Earl of Derby, prominent 19th century statesman
Lewis Randle Starkey, Conservative MP
 George Strauss, Baron Strauss, Labour politician and Father of the House of Commons
Sir Arthur Herbert Drummond Ramsay Steel-Maitland, 1st Baronet, PC Conservative MP, Chairman of the Conservative Party and Minister of Labour 
Charles Hanbury-Tracy, 1st Baron Sudeley Whig politician 
Henry Tancred, 19th-century New Zealand politician.
Sir John Stradling Thomas, Welsh Conservative Party politician
 Andrew Turner, British Conservative Party politician
 Yevhenia Tymoshenko (Eugenia), Ukrainian entrepreneur and lobbyist on behalf of her mother, former Prime Minister of Ukraine Yulia Tymoshenko
 William Henry Waddington, French statesman (eventually Prime Minister of France)
Sir George Gustavus Walker KCB JP, Conservative MP
Cathcart Wason MP in both New Zealand and Great Britain
Eugene Wason Liberal MP and lawyer
Samuel Whitbread, Liberal MP
Edward Whitley, Conservative MP
James Wigley, Tory MP
George Wilbraham, Whig MP
John Charles Williams Liberal Unionist MP
Sir Nicholas Winterton Conservative MP
Henry Christopher Wise Conservative MP
Sir John Wood, 1st Baronet Conservative MP
Dennis Kwok Hong Kong Legislative Council Member

 Sport 
 John Anton, English cricketer
 George Barker, English cricketer
 Robert Barlow (1827–1907), cricketer
 David Barttelot (1821–1852), English cricketer
 Samuel Bateson, Irish cricketer
 Denis Bingham, Irish cricketer
 Henry Boden, cricketer and founding member of Derbyshire County Cricket Club
 Frederick Bowden-Smith, first-class cricketer
 Trevor Bowring, first-class cricketer
 Edward Bradby, first-class cricketer
 Henry Bradby, first-class cricketer
 Henry Brandt, first-class cricketer
 Chris Brasher, Olympic gold medalist in the steeplechase at the 1956 Summer Olympics, co-founder of the London marathon and pace setter in Roger Bannister's world record mile
 William Bullock, first-class cricketer
 Walter Byles, first-class cricketer
 Frederick Capron, first-class cricketer
 Henry Cholmondeley, first-class cricketer
 Giles Clarke, the chairman of the England and Wales Cricket Board
John Clayton (rugby union), international who represented England in the First international rugby match.
 Richard Clement, first-class cricketer
 Louis Cockerell, first-class cricketer
 Granville Coghlan, rugby union international, represented Great Britain on 1927 British Lions tour to Argentina (1907–1983)
 George Cooke (1826–1862), cricketer
 Fulwar Craven, 4th Baron Craven, English nobleman and sportsman
 Frederick Crowder (1845–1938), cricketer and tennis player
 James Crowdy, first-class cricketer
 Joseph Dacre, first-class cricketer
 Peter Dowson, first-class cricketer
 John Marshall Dugdale, rugby union international who represented England in the first international rugby match in 1871.
 Frederick Morton Eden, first-class cricketer
 Edmund Ellis, first-class cricketer
 Francis Evelyn, first-class cricketer
 Nigel Fenton, first-class cricketer
 Patrick Fraser, Scottish first-class cricketer
 Cornelius Fryer, first-class cricketer
 Miles Giffard, English cricketer who was hanged for the murder of his parents.
 Joseph Fletcher Green, rugby union international who represented England in the first international rugby match in 1871.
 James Ford (1836–1877), cricketer
 Alex Grove, rugby player for Worcester Warriors and Scotland national rugby union team
 A. G. Guillemard, rugby union international who represented England in the first international rugby match in 1871 and later president of the Rugby Football Union.
 Thomas Hale (1829–1899), first-class cricketer
 Octavius Hanbury (1826–1882), first-class cricketer
 William Harrison (1838–1912), first-class cricketer
 George Hughes (1821–1872), first-class cricketer and the basis for the literary character Tom Brown
 Rupert Edward Inglis (1863–1916), England rugby international who was killed at the Battle of the Somme
 Kenneth Jackson, Scottish rugby union international and first-class cricketer
 Edward Kenney, first-class cricketer
 Charles Langton, first-class cricketer
 Alexander Law, first-class cricketer
 Henry Lindow, first-class cricketer
 Algernon Lushington, first-class cricketer
Arthur Lyon (rugby union), who represented England in the first 1871 Scotland versus England rugby union match.
 Dar Lyon, first class cricketer
 John Macartney-Filgate, Irish first-class cricketer
 Charles McCarthy, cricketer who played in Burma's only first-class cricket match in 1927.
 Douglas Mackessack (1903–1987), Scottish first-class cricketer, brother of the below
 Kenneth Mackessack (1902–1982), Scottish first-class cricketer, brother of the above
 Richard Montgomerie, English cricketer
 David Noble, first-class cricketer
 Rollo O'Dwyer, Argentine first-class cricketer
 Henry Pickard, first-class cricketer
 Abram Rawlinson, first-class cricketer
 Gerard Rotherham, recipient of the Wisden Cricketer of the Year award in 1918.
 Samuel Ruddock, Paralympic sprinter
 Eustace Rutter, first-class cricketer
 John Sandford (1832–1892), first-class cricketer
 Richard Seaman (1913–1939). One of the greatest British pre-war motor racing drivers. Infamously suffered a fatal crash at the 1939 Belgian Grand Prix.
 Ian Shield  (1914–2005), first-class cricketer
 Frank Smallwood (1867–1919), first-class cricketer
 Stephen Soames (1826–1908), first-class cricketer
 Francis Speed, first-class cricketer
 Frederick Stokes (1850–1929) the first captain of the England national rugby union team.
 Adrian Stoop, English rugby player
 William Surtees, World Rackets Champion
 Richard Sykes, Rugby player and founder of towns in North Dakota
 Theodore Tapp, first-class cricketer
 Henry Taswell, first-class cricketer
 Henry Tubb, first-class cricketer
 Dawson Turner, rugby union international who represented England in the first international rugby match in 1871.
 Frank Tobin, rugby union international who represented England in the first international rugby match in 1871.
 Richard Townsend (1829–1852), first-class cricketer
 Rowland Venables, first-class cricketer
 Sir Pelham Warner, England cricket captain and cricket administrator
 William Webb Ellis, the credited inventor of rugby football
 John Weston, cricketer
 Tom Wills, the inventor of Australian rules football
 Alfred Wilson (1828–1908), first-class cricketer
 William Yardley, cricketer and dramatist

 Fictional Old Rugbeians 
 Harry Paget Flashman, fictional Victorian anti-hero, originally created by author Thomas Hughes in his semi-autobiographical Tom Brown's Schooldays''
  Tom Brown, fictional hero from the novel Tom Brown's school days, which was created by author Thomas Hughes who is also an old Rugbeian.

See also 
 List of schools in the West Midlands

References

External links 
 Rugby School website
 The Rugbeian Society

 
Rugbeians
Warwickshire-related lists